Hack is a 1984 roguelike video game that introduced shops as gameplay elements and expanded available monsters, items, and spells. It later became the basis for NetHack.

History and development
Hack was created in 1982 by Jay Fenlason with the assistance of Kenny Woodland, Mike Thome, and Jonathan Payne, while students at Lincoln-Sudbury Regional High School. A greatly extended version was first released on Usenet in 1984 by Andries Brouwer. Brouwer continued to work on Hack until July 1985. Don Kneller ported the game to MS-DOS and continued development there. Development on all Hack versions ended within a few years. Hack descendant NetHack was released in 1987.

Hack is still available for Unix, and is distributed alongside many modern Unix-like OSes, including Debian, Ubuntu, the BSDs, Fedora, and others. Hack has also been ported to a variety of non-Unix-based platforms. NetHack is available for almost all platforms which run Hack. There is one exception: Hack is available,  but NetHack is unavailable, for the Game Boy Advance.

Gameplay
This describes Brouwer's version 1.0.3, which is the most canonical version, being the one installed by package managers on Linux systems.

Being developed by one man means the game is more balanced. Even when the player has discovered all properties of monsters, wands, potions, and has fathomed the role of "luck", the game remains as playable as ever. It may take ages before the player reaches that stage.  The player will be helped by rumors: cryptic hints, hidden in fortune cookies.

The object of the game is to delve into a dungeon to retrieve the Amulet of Yendor, and perish with as many game points as possible. The player can start out with a different ability set, such as Wizard or Cave(wo)man. The player confronts various monsters: hobgoblins, leprechauns, acid blobs, bats, centaurs, chameleons, dragons, ghosts, imps, trolls, and has weapons, armor, potions, wands, rings and special items to aid in this, e.g. related to fire there is a scroll, a ring, a monster and a wand, and their interplay is to be discovered.

There is time pressure because the player dies if their food runs out, though food is scattered around the dungeon. There is a limit to how much the player can carry, forcing them to leave valuable items behind. The amount of gold and gems the player possesses when they die increases their score, but holding them comes with a burden of more weight.

The player must enter Hell to recover the Amulet. Entering Hell for the uninitiated just means that "you burn to a crisp". (In NetHack, Hell is renamed.)

The player encounters special rooms such as shops, crypts, and vaults. Other spatial elements in the game are traps and swamps. As the player's experience grows, so do their abilities, score and the need for food.

Interface
Hack implements a graphical user interface using arrangements of ASCII or Extended ASCII glyphs to represent game elements. Some later ports of Hack, on AmigaOS for example, use graphical tiles in place of these letters and symbols.

Typical Hack session

References

External links
 

1984 video games
Unix games
Open-source video games
Roguelike video games
Video games developed in the United States